The Rosenkowitz Sextuplets (born 11 January 1974 in South Africa) were the first known set of sextuplets to survive infancy.

Biography
Born to Susan Wilson at Mowbray Maternity Hospital in Cape Town, South Africa, the sextuplets are:

The births quickly drew international attention as the first known set of sextuplets to survive infancy.

Mother Susan Wilson is a native Briton who emigrated to South Africa in 1967. The record shows that the father Colin divorced Susan in 1989.

As of 2013 the Rosenkowitz children lived in various locations around the world. David in Australia, Nicolette Cape Town (SA) and London (UK), Grant and Samantha in Cape Town (SA), Jason in Cork (Ireland), Emma in London (UK), and Elizabeth in Kent (UK).

See also
 Dionne quintuplets: Born in 1934, the first quintuplets known to survive their infancy.
 List of multiple births

References

External links
The Rosenkowitz Sextuplets at Quintland.com (with pictures)
Rosenkowitz six just want their privacy, at Timeslive.co.za

1974 births
People from Cape Town
White South African people
Sextuplets
Living people